Les Champs-Géraux (Gallo: Lez Chaunt-Jéraud) is a commune in the Côtes-d'Armor department of Brittany in northwestern France.

Population

Inhabitants of Les Champs-Géraux are called Campogérosiens in French.

See also
Communes of the Côtes-d'Armor department

References

External links

Communes of Côtes-d'Armor